Cruach nam Mult is a mountain in the Arrochar Alps, Argyll, Scotland which lies to the southern side of Hell's Glen. The mountain is near Loch Fyne and GlenGoil and is part of the northern side of the area of the Arrochar Alps that follow south to Loch Goil.

References

Mountains and hills of Argyll and Bute
Marilyns of Scotland
Grahams